In computer science and statistics, Bayesian classifier may refer to:
 any classifier based on Bayesian probability
 a Bayes classifier, one that always chooses the class of highest posterior probability
 in case this posterior distribution is modelled by assuming the observables are independent, it is a naive Bayes classifier